The Nevada National Guard is the component of the United States National Guard in Nevada. The governor of Nevada may call individuals or units of the Nevada National Guard into state service. The Constitution of the United States charges the National Guard of each state to support its dual federal and state missions.

The Nevada National Guard includes a total force of about 4,300 uniformed personnel with more than 3,000 Soldiers and about 1,200 Airmen. About 80 percent of Nevada National Guardsmen serve as so-called “traditional Guardsmen” who commit to participate in military training one weekend a month and 15 days each year in their respective military occupations and career fields. They are supported by full-time personnel, including about 480 federal technicians and 460 Active Guard and Reserve members.

The Nevada National Guard includes armories and facilities in eight of the state’s 16 counties and state capital with 16 primary facilities. In addition to headquarters’ Soldiers, the Nevada Army Guard includes the 17th Sustainment Brigade, the 991st Aviation Troop Command and the Recruiting and Retention Battalion. The Nevada Air Guard is composed of the 152nd Airlift Wing and 152nd Intelligence Squadron in Reno and the 232nd Operations Squadron in Indian Springs.

The governor is the commander-in-chief of the Nevada National Guard and appoints the adjutant general. Brig. Gen. Ondra Berry was appointed Nevada's adjutant general in September 2019.

History
English and American militia tradition provided the blueprint for the origins of Nevada’s state militia, eventually called the National Guard. This tradition served the patriot cause in the American Revolution. After the war, the 1792 Militia Act, under the new Constitution, provided for the president to call out state militias during invasion or emergency but failed to establish a national militia system, as many Federalists sought. During the antebellum period, compulsory military training of state militias was not enforced and almost completely ceased. In their place came volunteer and fraternal-like organizations that practiced marksmanship along with drills and ceremonies.

In Nevada, the same occurred in response to strained Native American relations and fear of secessionists before and during the Civil War. In the winter of 1859–60, the discovery of the Comstock Lode brought a “Rush to Washoe” that increased friction with the Native population in what was then still far-western Utah Territory. A loosely organized militia attacked Pyramid Lake Paiutes in retaliation for perceived crimes against white settlers. Ambushed by the Paiutes on their march to Pyramid Lake, the militia met disaster, with 76 killed. Union regulars and citizen militias from California mining towns quickly responded, defeating and dispersing the Paiutes by June 1860. In July, the War Department began construction of Fort Churchill and other federal posts in Nevada to maintain peace and protect the Overland Trail.

After Comstock Boom 

From 1880 to 1900, the Comstock mines dried up and the Silver State’s population plummeted. During this time, the Nevada Guard struggled to meet national standards suggested by larger states. Still, in 1892, with fewer than 50,000 people living in the state — the smallest in the nation by population, but fifth largest in area — Nevada Guardsmen held their first summer encampment in Carson City. Volunteer soldiers, many of them miners, came from as far away as Tuscarora in Elko County and Yerington in the Mason Valley. The encampment included rifle practice and a 3 a.m. “sham” attack. Nevada’s budget constraints only allowed guardsmen to receive $10 per encampment, compared to $33 per encampment for soldiers in New York. In 1896, Carson City Guard, Company F, earned the national marksmanship championship with Springfield rifles, even though “companies in the eastern States have been prone to deny this” and “did not believe the published records of the Carson Company to be correct.” After President William McKinley called on the states during the Spanish-American War, nearly every Nevada Guard unit disbanded as military men left for war.

In 1906, the final two units of infantry in the Nevada Guard disbanded after a federal inspector questioned their loyalty to the state. According to the federal officer from the Presidio in California: “The replies of both were that not a man could be relied upon to obey the order of the Governor, and I wish to add that in my opinion both captains and all company officers, as well as the enlisted men, would not only refuse to obey orders of the Governor, but would be arrayed on the other side [of labor violence].”

The Nevada Guard’s disbandment occurred simultaneously with the rise of labor radicalism, especially in Goldfield, Nevada, the state’s population center at the time, which included the Industrial Workers of the World. Even after the fall of Goldfield in the 1910s, labor groups repeatedly blocked the reorganization of the National Guard at the state legislature. Efforts stalled during World War I as most able-bodied men entered conscription instead of the state Guard.

In 1927, Nevada Governor Fred Balzar named Mineral County District Attorney Jay White state adjutant general, with the goal of reorganization. In 1928, the 40th Division established the 40th Military Police Company in Reno with 60 soldiers. White, who enthusiastically embraced his role as adjutant general, remained Nevada’s adjutant general even after Balzar’s death in 1934. He helped reorganize the Nevada National Guard again after the state force was federalized during World War II. During the war, the Nevada Guard deployed around the world and saw action in the Pacific Theater.

Cold War 

As the Iron Curtain fell across Eastern Europe with the beginning of the Cold War, and a hot war occurred in Korea (1950–53), major federal funds poured into the state for the reorganization of the Nevada National Guard. In 1948, the Nevada Army Guard reorganized with the 421st Anti-Aircraft Artillery Battalion. With the creation of the U.S. Air Force in 1947, Nevada received an Air National Guard unit with the 192nd Fighter Squadron, established in 1948. The 192nd operated out of the old Army Air Base north of Reno in present-day Stead. In 1951, the 192nd entered a 21-month deployment flying P-51 Mustang aircraft in the Korean War. During the war, the Nevada Air Guard suffered its only combat fatality in its history: Lt. Frank Salazar. After the war, the Nevada Air Guard entered a lease agreement with the city of Reno for land south of the airport, at Hubbard Field, present-day Reno-Tahoe International Airport. The 152nd Airlift Wing remains there today. In the 1950s, the Nevada Air Guard received massive sums of federal support, along with the Nevada Army Guard, for base improvements and the construction of armories. This was also true for other western states, especially California, as the federal government with its burgeoning defense establishments during the Cold War emerged as a major economic multiplier in the growth of the American West during the 20th century.

In 1967, the Nevada legislature re-wrote the state’s militia code, which provided for the expansion of the state’s military department, including a code of military justice and the creation of a full-time adjutant general position. In 1968, the Nevada Army Guard changed its mission from artillery to armored cavalry, and it also acquired its first helicopter (OH23B), the initial step toward bringing Army aviation assets to the state. Also that year, the Nevada Air Guard answered President Lyndon B. Johnson’s call-up in response to North Korea’s capture of the USS Pueblo, a naval intelligence vessel. While no direct military retaliation was initiated, more than 600 Nevada Air Guardsmen were activated on one-day notice for service in South Korea and various places around the United States.

The Nevada Air and Army Guard garnered numerous trophies for excellence in the late 1970s and 1980s. The Nevada Air Guard won the aerial reconnaissance championship, Photo Finish, against international competition in 1978 and Reconnaissance Air Meet championships in 1986 and 1990. Airman Magazine noted the “High Rollers of Reno” are the “best at what they do” — aerial reconnaissance. In 1980, the Nevada Army Guard’s 3rd Squadron, 116th Armored Cavalry re-designated as the 1st Squadron, 221st Cavalry. The 221st won two Goodrich Riding Trophies, 1984 and 1986, a highly-coveted armor trophy. In 1985, it gained national attention after it completed a 135-mile tank march from southern Nevada to Fort Irwin, California, commonly referred to as the “Death March,” with 71 tracked vehicles and 109 wheeled vehicles. The convoy stretched as long as 25 miles and included 420 soldiers. In 1986, the Nevada Army National Guard gained its first aviation battalion, the 1st Battalion, 113th Aviation, which operated CH-54 Skycranes, eventually receiving UH-60 Blackhawks and CH-47 Chinooks in the 1990s.

Total Force Concept 
After the Vietnam War and the draft, the Department of Defense adopted its total force concept, using the National Guard of the states more during federal missions. In the 1980s and 1990s, the Nevada Army National Guard expanded with various support missions, assisting the warfighter overseas and citizens at home during natural disaster. Both the Nevada Army and Air Guard deployed units during Operation Desert Storm and Desert Shield. In 1991, the then-152nd Reconnaissance Group was among the first aircrew to fly missions over Kuwait and Iraq. They dodged anti-aircraft artillery, obtained photos of burning wellheads, spotted strategic targets and conducted assessments on the first morning of the war. Thirteen airmen of the unit received the Distinguished Flying Cross. Additionally, the 72nd Military Police deployed to Saudi Arabia where they operated and maintained prisoner of war camps. In 1995, the U.S. Air Force moved away from manned reconnaissance, and the 152nd re-designated as the 152nd Airlift Wing operating C-130 aircraft.

In the Post-9/11 Era, the Nevada Air and Army Guard entered an unprecedented operations tempo. This deployment cycle has become the standard for the Nevada National Guard, and it has come with a cost. During the 1864th Transportation Company’s deployment to Iraq in 2005, Spc. Anthony Cometa, of Las Vegas, was manning a HMMWV machine gun turret when his vehicle lost control and flipped. One day after his 21st birthday, Cometa died in the accident. Two months after Cometa's death, a rocket-propelled grenade struck the fuel tank of a Chinook helicopter in Afghanistan, killing Chief Warrant Officer 3 John M. Flynn, of Sparks, and Sgt. Patrick D. Stewart, of Fernley. Also killed in the crash were two Oregon Army National Guardsman and an active duty Soldier. In 2013, the Nevada Guard named the field maintenance complex at the Las Vegas Readiness Center after Cometa. Additionally, a memorial to the five Army aircrew killed stands at the Army Aviation Support Facility in Stead, Nevada.

Additionally, the Nevada Guard’s role in emergency response in the U.S. increased. In 2016, the 152nd Airlift Wing was named the newest unit to operate the U.S. Forest Service’s Modular Airborne Fire Fighting System, or MAFFS. One of four military C-130 units nationwide operating the mission, the 152nd can be called to fight wildland fires around the nation. In 2017, the Nevada Army Guard and Air Guard responded to more domestic response activations than any year in its history, including floods in northern Nevada and support of hurricane response efforts in Texas, Florida and Puerto Rico.

Nevada Army National Guard Units
The Nevada Army Guard is composed of a Joint Force Headquarters, the 17th Sustainment Brigade, the 991st Aviation Troop Command, the Medical Detachment, Recruiting and Retention Battalion and the 92nd Civil Support Team:  
 Joint Force Headquarters (HQ at Carson City) 
 106th Public Affairs Detachment
 3600th Senior Trial Defense Unit
 17th Sustainment Brigade (HQ at Las Vegas)
 Special Troops Battalion 
 72d Military Police Company
 100th Quartermaster Company 
 593d Transportation Company 
 1864th Transportation Company
 3665th Ordnance Company (EOD) 
 240th Engineer Company
 777th Engineer Detachment
 757th Combat Sustainment Support Battalion (HQ at Stead)
 137th Military Police Company
 150th Maintenance Company 
 485th Military Police Company 
 609th Engineer Company 
 1859th Transportation Company
 991st Multi-Functional Brigade (HQ at Stead) 
 Aviation Troop Command (HQ at Army Aviation Support Facility (AASF) & Harry Reid Readiness Center, Reno)
45th Operational Support Airlift (C-12) at AASF, Reno
 Detachment 1, Company B, 3d Battalion (Security and Support), 140th Aviation Regiment (UH-72A) at Cheyenne Air Center, North Las Vegas
 Detachment 1, Company D, 3d Battalion (Security and Support), 140th Aviation Regiment (UH-72A) at Cheyenne Air Center, North Las Vegas
 Company B, 1st Battalion (General Support), 189th Aviation Regiment (CH-47F) At AASF, Reno
Detachment 1, Company G, 2d Battalion (General Support), 238th Aviation Regiment (MEDEVAC) (UH-60L) at AASF, Reno
 Detachment 3, Company B, 2d Battalion, 641st Aviation Regiment (C-12) at AASF, Reno
 1st Squadron, 221st Cavalry Regiment (HQ at Las Vegas)
422d Signal Battalion (Expeditionary)
 421st Regional Training Institute (HQ at Las Vegas) 
 Medical Detachment (HQ at Reno) 
 92d Civil Support Team (HQ at Carson City)

Nevada Air National Guard

152nd Airlift Wing 
152nd Operations Group
192nd Airlift Squadron 
152nd Operations Squadron
152nd Maintenance Group
152nd Maintenance Squadron 
152nd Maintenance Operations Flight
152nd Mission Support Group
152nd Civil Engineer Squadron
152nd Communications Flight
152nd Force Support Squadron
152nd Security Forces Squadron
152nd Logistics Readiness Squadron
152nd Medical Group
Detachment 1 (CERFP)
152nd Intelligence Squadron
232nd Combat Training Squadron

Funding
Under the direction of two state employees — the governor and the adjutant general — the Nevada Military Department oversees and manages the Nevada National Guard’s missions, facilities and training. State of Nevada employees provide administrative, accounting, personnel, firefighting, security, maintenance and custodial support for all facilities assigned to the Nevada Military Department. Not all funds used to pay personnel come from state coffers; in fact, more than 80 percent of personnel expenditures for military department state employees are from federal funds.

Adjutant General

The Adjutant General of Nevada is the senior officer of the Nevada National Guard overseeing command of more than 4,000 Nevada Army and Air National Guard personnel and responsible for both the federal and state missions of the Nevada National Guard. The adjutant general is appointed by the governor of Nevada. The position of adjutant general in Nevada was created following the state's Organic Act in 1861.

In accordance with federal law, the Territorial Legislature defined the "enrolled" militia as "every free, able-bodied white male inhabitant...between the ages of eighteen and forty-five years" except those exempted by law. Similar legislation was established following Nevada's entrance into statehood in 1864. Under Nevada law, the adjutant general serves as the senior military officer. Throughout the state's first century, though, the obligations were ex-officio positions of other offices, including lieutenant governor and secretary of state.

In 1948, the Nevada National Guard re-organized after it federalized for service in World War II. This new force included both the Nevada Army National Guard and the emergence of the Nevada Air National Guard.

In 1967, Nevada changed its militia law to create a full-time adjutant general position in the state. Since 2002, the adjutant general has worked out of the Office of the Adjutant General in Carson City, Nev.

References

External links
Bibliography of Nevada Army National Guard History compiled by the United States Army Center of Military History
 Nevada National Guard Magazine – Battle Born printed by AQP Publishing, Inc
 
 
 Nevada National Guard
 92nd Weapons of Mass Destruction - Civil Support Team

National Guard (United States)
Military in Nevada